The men's long jump event was part of the track and field athletics programme at the 1920 Summer Olympics. The competition was held on Tuesday, August 17, 1920, and on Wednesday, August 18, 1920. 29 long jumpers from eleven nations competed. No nation had more than 4 runners, suggesting the limit had been reduced from the 12 maximum in force in 1908 and 1912. The event was won by William Petersson of Sweden, the first time an athlete not from the United States took gold in the long jump.

Background

This was the sixth appearance of the event, which is one of 12 athletics events to have been held at every Summer Olympics. None of the jumpers from the pre-war 1912 Games returned. Sol Butler of the United States was the favorite; he had jumped 7.52 metres to win the U.S. Olympic trials.

Belgium, Czechoslovakia, Monaco, and Switzerland each made their first appearance in the event. The United States appeared for the sixth time, the only nation to have long jumpers at each of the Games so far.

Competition format

The 1920 format continued to use the two-round format used in 1900 and since 1908. The number of finalists expanded from 3 in previous Games to 6 in 1920. Each jumper had three jumps in the qualifying round; finalists received an additional three jumps, with qualifying round jumps still counting if the final jumps were not better.

Records

These were the standing world and Olympic records (in metres) prior to the 1920 Summer Olympics.

Schedule

Results

The best six long jumpers qualified for the final.

References

Sources
 
 

Long jump
Long jump at the Olympics